The Spirits of St. Louis were a basketball franchise based in St. Louis that played in the American Basketball Association (ABA) from 1974 to 1976. This was the third and last city of a franchise that had begun as a charter member in 1967 as the Houston Mavericks before a shift to the Carolinas in 1969 to play as the Cougars. They were one of two teams still in existence at the end of the ABA that did not survive the league's merger with the National Basketball Association (NBA). They were a member of the ABA in its last two seasons, 1974–75 and 1975–76, while playing their home games at the St. Louis Arena. Under terms of the ABA–NBA merger, the owners of the Spirits continued to receive a portion of NBA television revenue until 2014, when a revised agreement was reached with the league.

History 
The Spirits (who took their name from the Atlantic Ocean-crossing plane flown by Charles Lindbergh) were the third incarnation of a franchise that began as the Houston Mavericks and later the Carolina Cougars.  However, only a few players from the 1973–74 Cougars followed the team to St. Louis, so the Spirits were essentially an expansion team. By that time, St. Louis was six years removed from NBA basketball, having lost the Hawks to Atlanta after the 1967-68 season.

The Spirits were a colorful team featuring a number of players, both on and off the court, who were fairly successful in their basketball careers. Among them were Moses Malone, acquired during their second and final season, who went on to a long and successful career in the NBA, culminating in enshrinement in the Basketball Hall of Fame. Maurice Lucas spent most of his time in the ABA as a Spirit, then later became an all-star in the NBA with the Portland Trail Blazers. Other well-known players that played for the team included former Boston Celtics sixth man Don Chaney, future Celtics head coach M.L. Carr, and Ron Boone, who held the record for consecutive games played in pro basketball for many years. One of the most colorful players on the team was forward Marvin Barnes, famous for stories about his off-court behavior and lack of understanding of time zones.

A couple of off-court personalities from the team became well known as well. One of the coaches in 1975 was former NBA player Rod Thorn, who became the NBA's vice president of basketball operations (in essence, the league's chief disciplinarian and the number-two man behind commissioner David Stern) for a number of years. On radio, the team featured Bob Costas as its play-by-play announcer on KMOX. Costas would go on to a highly successful career working for NBC television and radio.

After a slow start in their inaugural season, 1974–75, the Spirits reached the playoffs with a late rush, then upset the defending ABA champion New York Nets in the first round of the playoffs. But the team squandered this good start the following year. Despite inheriting several players (including Malone) from the Utah Stars after that franchise failed in the middle of the season, the Spirits finished well out of playoff contention in 1975–76. Attendance in St. Louis fell through the floor; they were lucky to draw crowds of more than 1,000 people in an 18,000-seat arena, and frequently drew crowds in the hundreds. At season's end, negotiations were under way to move the franchise to Salt Lake City, Utah as the Utah Rockies.

NBA merger

In the summer of 1976, with the ABA at the point of financial collapse, the six surviving franchises (the Virginia Squires went bankrupt immediately after the final season) began negotiating a merger with the NBA. But the senior circuit decided to accept only four teams from the rival league: the Nets (the last ABA champion), Denver Nuggets, Indiana Pacers and San Antonio Spurs.

The NBA placated John Y. Brown, owner of the Kentucky Colonels, by giving him a $3.3 million settlement in exchange for shutting his team down. (Brown later used much of that money to buy the Buffalo Braves of the NBA.) But the owners of the Spirits, the brothers Ozzie and Daniel Silna, struck a prescient deal to acquire future television money from the teams that joined the NBA, a 1/7 share from each franchise (or nearly 2% of the entire NBA's TV money), in perpetuity. (The deal allocated 45% for each of the Silnas and 10% for their lawyer Donald Scupak, who brokered the deal. Ozzie died in 2016.) With network TV deals becoming more and more lucrative, the deal has made the Silnas wealthy, earning them $186 million as of 2008, according to the Cleveland Plain Dealer, and $255 million as of 2012 according to The New York Times. (The NBA nearly succeeded in buying out the Silnas in 1982 by offering $5 million over eight years, but negotiations stalled when the siblings demanded $8 million over five.) On June 27, 2007, it was extended for another eight years, ensuring another $100 million+ windfall for the Silnas. In 2014, the Silnas reached agreement with the NBA to greatly reduce the perpetual payments and take a lump sum of $500 million. In the last few years before the lump sum agreement, the Silnas were receiving $14.57 million a year, despite being owners of a team that hasn't played a game in over 40 years. (The Silnas will, however, still be receiving a now much smaller portion of the television revenue through a new partnership with the former ABA teams the Nets, Nuggets, Pacers and Spurs.)

Documentary
On October 8, 2013, ESPN presented a documentary about the team, Free Spirits, as part of its 30 for 30 series.  Part of the show contained the fact that the Silnas had been suing the NBA for "hundreds of millions of dollars more" they feel the NBA owes them, presumably for NBA League Pass subscriptions and streaming video (the Silnas dropped the suit when the NBA bought their rights out). As a result, – and on the advice of their attorneys – the Silnas refused to be interviewed for the program, directed by Daniel Forer.  However, many players, members of management, and Costas – among others – shared their memories of the franchise.

Basketball Hall of Famers

Notes:
 1 Inducted as a contributor.

Season by season

References

External links
 Spirits of St. Louis history from RememberTheABA.com
 1975-76 Spirits of St. Louis Official Program
 "The TV Deal the NBA Wishes It Had Not Made," Los Angeles Times, July 31, 2006
 "From the Annals of NBA Business," The Plain Dealer, Feb. 7, 2009

 
American Basketball Association teams
Basketball teams established in 1974
Basketball teams disestablished in 1976
Sports in St. Louis
Basketball teams in Missouri
Defunct basketball teams in the United States
1974 establishments in Missouri
1976 disestablishments in Missouri